Freiwald may refer to the following geographical objects: 

 the Austrian part of the Gratzen Mountains
 Freiwald (Mittelsachsen), a forest near Brand-Erbisdorf in the county of Mittelsachsen, Germany

Freiwald may also refer to the surname of the following people:
 André Freiwald (* 1961), German geologist and palaeontologists
 Friedrich Freiwald (1911–1974), German lawyer and politician
 Jindřich Freiwald (1890–1945), Czech architect
 Ludwig Freiwald (1898–??), German writer and propagandist